Albert Clyde "Chief" Youngblood (June 13, 1900—July 6, 1968) was an American professional baseball player. A right-handed pitcher, his two-week career in Major League Baseball in 1922 lasted from July 16 to July 31. He batted left-handed.

A native of Hillsboro, Texas, Youngblood was nicknamed "Chief", an appellation used throughout his brief career. He was signed by the Washington Senators and remained with the team for 16 days. He later played minor league baseball from 1924 to 1926.

Youngblood died in Amarillo, Texas three weeks past his 68th birthday.

External links
, or Baseball Almanac

1900 births
1968 deaths
Major League Baseball pitchers
Washington Senators (1901–1960) players
Chattanooga Lookouts players
Memphis Chickasaws players
Kansas City Blues (baseball) players
Omaha Buffaloes players
Columbus Senators players
Baseball players from Texas
People from Hillsboro, Texas